Satu Sinikka Tuomisto (born 17 February 1986 in Tampere) is a Finnish model who won the 2008 Miss Finland competition. She also took part in the Miss Universe 2008 competition.

In February 2016 she got engaged to Petri Aarnio.  They were married in August 2017 and divorced in summer 2019.

References 

1986 births
Miss Finland winners
Finnish female models
Miss Universe 2008 contestants
Living people